Kovk is a dispersed settlement on the edge of a karst plateau north of Ajdovščina in the Littoral region of Slovenia. Together with the ridge-top villages of  Predmeja, Otlica, and Gozd, it is part of an area locally known as Gora (literally, 'the mountain').

References

External links 

Kovk at Geopedia

Populated places in the Municipality of Ajdovščina